Cricetulodon is an extinct genus of muroid rodent named in 1965. It lived from the Middle Aragonian to the late Turolian.

The genus includes the following species:
 Cricetulodon bugesiensis
 Cricetulodon hartenbergeri
 Cricetulodon lucentensis
 Cricetulodon meini 
 Cricetulodon sabadellensis

References

External links
Cricetulodon at the Paleobiology Database

Cricetidae
Miocene rodents
Prehistoric mammals of Europe